Lily Elisabeth Strömberg-von Essen (24 September 1896 – 21 May 1990) was a Swedish tennis player. She competed at the 1920 and 1924 Summer Olympics and finished fifth in four of her six events, which included women's singles and women's and mixed doubles.

References

1896 births
1990 deaths
Swedish female tennis players
Olympic tennis players of Sweden
Tennis players at the 1920 Summer Olympics
Tennis players at the 1924 Summer Olympics
Sportspeople from Lund